Al-Malik al-Mansur Fakhr ad-Din Uthman ibn Jàqmaq, more simply known as Al-Mansur Uthman (al-Malik al-Mansur Fahr ad-Dīn ʿ Uthman ibn Jaqmaq) was Sultan of Cairo's Mamluk Burji dynasty (1453).

Biography
At 80 years old, the death of Sultan Jaqmaq allowed his son, Uthman (fathered from a Greek slave) to take the title of Al-Malik al-Mansur Fakhr ad-Din Uthman. His father named him Uthman after the House of Osman to celebrate the Ottoman victory against the European Christians at the Battle of Varna. At the beginning of his reign, he was whipped by his principal minister. After disputes with Amir on the amount of donations to various groups of Mamelukes that had become a burden, street battles ensued between the groups of Mamelukes. Inal al-Ajrud group and the Mamluks house Barquq occupied Kalat al-Djabal (Fortress of the Mount). He was nominated as Sultan by the Abbasid Caliph of Cairo and four kadis with the title of Al-Malik al-Mansur Fakhr ad-Din. Uthman had no support and because of his behavior was deposed on 15 March 1453.

He was then imprisoned in Alexandria until the reign of Sayf ad-Din Khushqadam. He later returned to Cairo during the rule of Qaitbay who was a Mamluk to his father, Jaqmaq. In 1469, he went to Mecca to do Islamic pilgrimage. Then he lived in Damietta and studied Fiqh. He died in 1484 in Damietta and was later buried along with his father in Cairo.

Family
His only daughter was married to Azdumur al-Ibrahimi al-Zahiri Jaqmaq known as al-Tawil in 1474.

See also
History of Islam

References

Sources

 Encyclopaedia of Islam, Brill Publishers, Leiden, sv "Mamluks".

1435 births
1484 deaths
Burji sultans
15th-century Mamluk sultans